Samuele Neglia (born 11 August 1991) is an Italian professional footballer who plays as a winger for  club Fermana on loan from Cerignola.

Career
Born in Turin, Neglia started his career in Salernitana youth sector.

As a senior, in 2010 he moved to Sapri on Serie D.

For the 2011–12 season, he signed with Serie C2 club Paganese. Neglia made his professional debut on 4 September 2011 against Celano. This season, the club won the promotion to Serie C.

In 2014 he joined to Viterbese.

In August 2018, he joined to Bari in Serie D. Neglia won the promotion with the team this season.

On 4 October 2020, he was loaned to Fermana. He left Bari at the end of the season.

On 15 July 2021, he signed with Serie C club Reggiana.

On 12 August 2022, Neglia joined Cerignola. On 31 January 2023, he returned to Fermana on loan.

Personal life
In 2019, Neglia graduated as a psychologist.

References

External links
 
 

1991 births
Living people
Footballers from Turin
Italian footballers
Association football wingers
Serie C players
Lega Pro Seconda Divisione players
Serie D players
U.S. Salernitana 1919 players
Paganese Calcio 1926 players
A.S. Melfi players
U.S. Viterbese 1908 players
A.C.N. Siena 1904 players
S.S.C. Bari players
Fermana F.C. players
A.C. Reggiana 1919 players
S.S.D. Audace Cerignola players